La Estrella is a town and municipality in Antioquia Department, Colombia. La Estrella is part of The Metropolitan Area of the Aburrá Valley.

References

Municipalities of Antioquia Department
The Metropolitan Area of the Aburrá Valley